A president pro tempore or speaker pro tempore is a constitutionally recognized officer of a legislative body who presides over the chamber in the absence of the normal presiding officer. The phrase pro tempore is Latin "for the time being".

In Argentina, a similar role is carried by the Provisional President of the Argentine Senate in the absence of the Vice President of Argentina. By the 1994 amendment to the 1853 Constitution, the Vice President is designated as the Senate President.

See also
President pro tempore of the United States Senate
President pro tempore of the California State Senate
President pro tempore of the Kentucky Senate
President pro tempore of the North Carolina Senate
President pro tempore of the North Dakota Senate
President pro tempore of the Oklahoma Senate
President pro tempore of the Pennsylvania Senate
President pro tempore of the Senate of Virginia
President pro tempore of the Senate of the Philippines
President pro tempore of the Union of South American Nations
Speaker Pro Tempore of the Canadian Senate
Speaker pro tempore of the House of Representatives of Puerto Rico

References